Trence Mason (born August 6, 1993) is a former American football running back. He played college football at Auburn and was drafted by the St. Louis Rams in the third round of the 2014 NFL Draft.

High school career
Mason attended Park Vista Community High School in Boynton Beach, Florida, where he was a standout football and basketball player, and also ran track. He rushed for 1,643 yards and 24 touchdowns as a senior in 2011, and was named the 2009 Palm Beach Large School Offensive Player of the Year and First-Team All-Palm Beach County by the Sun-Sentinel.

He was also on the school's track & field team, where he competed as a sprinter and jumper. He placed 7th in the 100 meters at the 2009 Park Vista Meet, with a time of 10.9 seconds. At the 2010 Palm Beach County Championship, he earned a sixth-place finish in the long jump event, recording a career-best jump of 6.63 meters. He also competed in high jump, he got a top-jump of 1.88 meters at the 2011 Warrior Invitational.

Considered a four-star recruit by Rivals.com, he was rated the 14th best running back in his class. He committed to Auburn over offers from West Virginia and Mississippi.

College career
In his first college game, Auburn against Utah State, Mason returned a kick-off 97 yards for a touchdown.

In the 2013 SEC Championship Game against Missouri, Mason set an SEC Championship rushing record with 304 yards (breaking LSU's Justin Vincent's previous 2003 record of 201 yards), touchdown record with four touchdowns, rushing attempts record with 46 carries and was named the game's most valuable player.

As a junior in 2013, Mason was a first-team All-Southeastern Conference (SEC) selection. He was named one of the six finalists for the 2013 Heisman Trophy.

In the 2014 BCS National Championship Game, Mason rushed for 195 yards on 34 carries and a touchdown in a 34–31 defeat by the Florida State Seminoles. He finished his season with 1,816 rushing yards, breaking the school record held by Heisman winner Bo Jackson (1,786 set in 1985). It was also the third-highest rushing yards total in a single season in SEC history, behind only Herschel Walker (1,891 yards in 1981) and Darren McFadden (1,830 yards in 2007). Later single-season yardage marks set by Alabama's Derrick Henry (2,219 yards), and LSU's Leonard Fournette (1,953 yards) placed Mason's 2013 performance at fifth-highest all-time.

Statistics

Professional career

St. Louis/Los Angeles Rams
Mason announced on January 9, 2014 that he would forgo his remaining eligibility and enter the NFL Draft. He was drafted by the St. Louis Rams in the third round (75th overall) of the 2014 NFL Draft. Mason was the Rams' third pick in the draft, behind former teammate and second overall pick, Greg Robinson.

In Week 7, 2014 in a game against Seattle, Mason ran for 85 yards on 18 carries with 1 touchdown in a St. Louis win. In Week 11, he had 113 yards on 29 carries in a game against Denver. During a Week 13 matchup against Oakland, Mason ran for 117 yards on 14 carries and 2 touchdowns, to go along with one receiving touchdown. After rushing for 765 yards and 4 touchdowns in 2014, Mason was named to the PFWA All-Rookie Team.

Following the 2015 season and going into the 2016 season, it was reported that Mason had not been in contact with coaches or players from the Rams since the end of the season. Coach Jeff Fisher stated "I tried numerous times to reach him, he has made a decision not to communicate with us, not to talk. Not talking to his teammates. Right now we're more concerned about his well-being than we are his football career." Mason had several run-ins with the law and displayed erratic behavior throughout the summer. On July 30, the Rams placed Mason on the reserve/did not report list.

On March 10, 2017, Mason was released by the Rams. Former college teammate Ricardo Louis stated in April 2017 that Mason was working towards coming back to the NFL for the upcoming season.

Saskatchewan Roughriders
On May 30, 2018, Mason signed with the Saskatchewan Roughriders of the CFL. Mason's usage increased following the suspension and release of Jerome Messam on voyeurism charges. With increased playing time, Mason proved to be a key contributor to a lackluster Roughriders offense, including producing a 20 carry 117 yard effort during the 2018 Banjo Bowl, a Riders win. Despite playing in all 18 games, Mason was held without a score until near the end of the year, when he had three rushing touchdowns in the final six games of the regular season. Mason finished the year with a higher rushing average than a receiving average. He missed the Roughrider's lone playoff game due to injury. During the off-season Roughriders signed William Powell in free agency, at which time Mason's injury was revealed to be a damaged ACL requiring surgery, which could keep Mason from playing in 2019. He was released by the Riders on May 10, 2019.

NFL statistics

Regular season

CFL statistics

Regular season

Personal life
His father, Vincent Mason, is a member of hip hop group De La Soul.

After Mason led police on a high-speed ATV chase, Mason's mother stated that Mason had the "mindset of a 10-year-old" due to head injuries sustained during his career. She noticed her son’s behavior was different after the 2015 season: “Clearly, we could see the change. Like, completely... As much as he’s accomplished, as hard as he’s worked, as much as he’s built his character, in record-breaking time it’s going downhill because of what’s going on." In November, Mason pleaded no contest to charges related to the ATV chase. Mason was arrested in January 2017 for the incident and charged with a third degree felony of fleeing and eluding without regard for others' safety or property.

References

External links
 Auburn Tigers bio

1993 births
Living people
American football running backs
Auburn Tigers football players
St. Louis Rams players
Los Angeles Rams players
People from Amityville, New York
African-American players of American football
Players of American football from New York (state)
Sportspeople from Suffolk County, New York
Saskatchewan Roughriders players
Canadian football running backs
21st-century African-American sportspeople